"Delilah" is a song by English indie rock band Florence and the Machine from their third studio album, How Big, How Blue, How Beautiful (2015). It was written by Florence Welch and Isabella Summers, and produced by Markus Dravs. The song was released on 27 November 2015 as the album's fourth and final single.

Critical reception
Jon Blistein of Rolling Stone wrote that "Delilah" begins sparsely with Welch's multi-tracked call-and-response vocals sailing atop a simple piano and simmering synths.

Music video
The music video for "Delilah" was directed by Vincent Haycock and premiered on 21 October 2015 as part of the video series The Odyssey. Filmed in Los Angeles, the video opens with an intense monologue from an old man. Florence Welch is then seen roaming through a "maze of motel rooms – dancing, writhing intensely, cutting a man's hair and encountering a horrifying goblin." At the end of the video, Welch "triumphantly rides through the streets of Los Angeles [...] as a hat tip to her newfound freedom."

In an interview with Rookie, Haycock said of the video, "The cutting of the hair was a direct reference to the biblical [story of] Delilah, but then it veered off into something more personal to Florence. Since this song was always planned as being the end of the series, we decided to make it about [her] returning to her true self, killing off the ego version of herself, and finding her way home again."

Track listings
Digital download – Galantis Remix
"Delilah" (Galantis Remix) – 5:37
"Delilah" (Galantis Remix / Radio Edit) – 4:11

Limited-edition 12-inch single (Record Store Day exclusive)
A1. "Delilah"
A2. "Delilah" (Demo)
B. "Only Love Can Break Your Heart" (live)

Credits and personnel
Credits adapted from the liner notes of How Big, How Blue, How Beautiful.

Recording
 Engineered at The Pool (London)
 Mixed at Toast Studios (London)
 Mastered at Sterling Sound (New York City)

Personnel

Florence and the Machine
 Florence Welch – vocals, backing vocals
 Chris Hayden – drums, percussion
 Mark Saunders – bass

Additional personnel
 Markus Dravs – production
 Robin Baynton – engineering, organ, piano
 Jonathan Sagis – engineering assistance
 Iain Berryman – engineering assistance
 Leo Abrahams – electric guitar
 Pete Prokopiw – programming
 Craig Silvey – mixing
 Eduardo de la Paz – mixing assistance
 Ted Jensen – mastering

Charts

Weekly charts

Year-end charts

Release history

Notes

References

2015 singles
2015 songs
Florence and the Machine songs
Island Records singles
Republic Records singles
Song recordings produced by Markus Dravs
Songs written by Florence Welch